Navarro may refer to:

Places
 Navarro (Avilés), a parish in Avilés, Asturias, Spain
 Navarro, Buenos Aires, Argentina
 Navarro Partido, the partido of Navarro, in Argentina
 Navarro, California, USA
 Navarro, Gurabo, Puerto Rico, USA; a barrio
 Navarro, Texas, USA
 Navarro County, Texas, USA
 Navarro, California, USA; an alternate name for Wendling, California
 Navarro, Tubajon, a barangay in the province of Dinagat Islands, Philippines

Other uses
 Navarro (surname)
 Grenache or Navarro, a Spanish-French wine grape varietal
 Cinsaut or Navarro, a French red wine grape varietal
 The Navarros (band), a U.S. teen band
 Navarro (TV series), a drama series based on a French detective
 Navarro Discount Pharmacies, a pharmacy chain, photo service, and pharmacy benefit manager in the United States
 Navarro-Aragonese, a Medieval Romance language in the north of Spain or a variant of it, Navarrese

See also

 
 
 Nevarro, a fictional planet in the Star Wars franchise
 Novarro (surname)
 Novaro (surname)